ZBasic is a compiler which was first released by Simutek (Tucson, Arizona) in 1980.  The combined efforts of Andrew Gariepy, Scott Terry, David Overton, Greg Branche, and Halbert Laing led to versions for MS-DOS,  Apple II, Macintosh, CP/M, and TRS-80 computers. ZBasic is a fast and efficient BASIC compiler with an integrated development environment. It aims to be used as a cross-platform development system, where the same source code can be compiled to different platforms without any modifications.

In 1991, Harry Gish and 32 Bit Software Inc. of Dallas, Texas purchased the MS-DOS version. Nando Favaro expanded it to include 16- and 32-bit-specific machine code as well as VGA and VESA video. Zedcor concentrated on the Macintosh market and renamed it FutureBASIC.

Features
ZBasic features device independent graphics: the same compiled code can work on different display resolutions and colors, and even in text mode. Original PC versions include graphical support up to EGA for MS-DOS.

ZBasic includes BCD (binary coded decimal) math with precision up to 54 digits.

INDEX$ is an array of variable length strings that can be easily sorted, searched, etc.

References 
 TRS-80 releases
 ZBasic manual  'ZBasic, Interactive Compiler', by Andrew R. Gariepy, Scott Terry, David Overton, Greg Branche and Halbert Laing. Documentation by Michael A. Gariepy. Fourth Edition 4/87 (C)1985-1987 Zedcor Inc.
 'ZBasic-PC/386', modifications by Nando Favaro. Documentation by Harry Gish. First Edition 3/91 (C)1991 32 Bit Software Inc.
 ZBasic 5 reviewed by Dave Kelly for MacTech magazine

1980 software
BASIC compilers
CP/M software
Apple II software
Classic Mac OS software